Chellakannu is a 1995 Tamil-language romantic drama film directed by N. Rathnam. The film stars Vignesh and Yuvarani. It was released on 12 May 1995.

Plot

Chellakannu (Vignesh) and Chandra (Yuvarani) are cousins, and they love each other since their childhood. Chandra then leaves the village for studying in the city and Chellakannu cannot forget her. When she is back, their family decide to marry them.

Dhandapani (Radha Ravi), Chellakannu's father, is the village Panchayat headman. One day, he punishes Rajavel (Babloo Prithviraj) for his bad behaviour towards a woman. Rajavel and his father Kailasam (Vijay Krishnaraj) decide to take revenge and to create a conflict between Dhandapani and Thangavel (Livingston), Chandra's father. At the village Panchayat, Thangavel is punished by Dhandapani for a crime he did not commit, thus Kailasam and Rajavel succeed in their plan.

A humiliated Thangavel cancels his daughter's marriage. He then becomes friends with Kailasam and Thangavel contests the Panchayat headman's election but Dhandapani won the election. Thangavel, who was upset with the election result, arranges his daughter Chandra's marriage with Rajavel.

Later, Thangavel realizes that Rajavel is a womaniser and cancels the marriage with Dhandapani's help. The rest of the story is what happens to Chellakannu and Chandra.

Cast

Vignesh as Chellakannu
Yuvarani as Chandra
Radha Ravi as Dhandapani, Chellakannu's father
Livingston as Thangavel, Chandra's father
R. Sundarrajan as Nagarajan
Manorama as Kaliyamurthy
Vadivelu
Vijay Krishnaraj as Kailasam
Babloo Prithviraj as Rajavel
Meesai Murugesan
Kavitha as Kamalamba, Chellakannu's mother
Vaiyapuri as Barber
Shankar as Chellakannu (child)
Monica as Chandra (child)

Soundtrack

The film score and the soundtrack were composed by Deva. The soundtrack, released in 1995, features 7 tracks with lyrics written by Pulamaipithan.

References

https://www.imdb.com/title/tt8929858/reference

1995 films
Films scored by Deva (composer)
1990s Tamil-language films